2018 Italian Athletics Indoor Championships was the 49th edition of the Italian Athletics Indoor Championships and were held in Ancona.

Champions

See also
2017 Italian Athletics Championships

References

External links
 All results at FIDAL web site

Italian Athletics Championships
Athletics
Italian Athletics Indoor Championships